McBoyle v. United States, 283 U.S. 25 (1931), was a United States Supreme Court case.

Background 
William McBoyle transported a plane that he knew to be stolen from Ottawa, Illinois to Guymon, Oklahoma.

Case 
McBoyle was accused of violating the National Motor Vehicle Theft Act.  The petitioners claimed that since the act did not specifically mention aircraft, it did not apply to aircraft.

Decision 
The court held that, since other acts – such as the Tariff Act of 1930 – specifically excluded aircraft in its definition of a vehicle, the law must be interpreted narrowly. Justice Holmes stated:

Although it is not likely that a criminal will carefully consider the text of the law before he murders or steals, it is reasonable that a fair warning should be given to the world in language that the common world will understand, of what the law intends to do if a certain line is passed.  To make the warning fair, so far as possible the line should be clear.

This case is a good example of the canon of ejusdem generis ("of the same kind, class, or nature").

See also
List of United States Supreme Court cases, volume 283

References

External links 
 
 

1931 in United States case law
United States Supreme Court cases
United States statutory interpretation case law
Texas County, Oklahoma
Vehicle law
Aviation security
Ottawa, Illinois
United States Supreme Court cases of the Hughes Court